King Ping of Zhou (died 16 April 720 BC), personal name Ji Yijiu, was the thirteenth king of the Zhou dynasty and the first of the Eastern Zhou dynasty.

History
He was the son of King You of Zhou and Queen Shen (申后).

King You had exiled Queen Shen and Ji Yijiu after the king became enamoured with his concubine Bao Si and made her queen and his son Bofu his heir. As a result, Queen Shen’s father, the Marquess of Shen, teamed with the Quanrong nomads and local satellite states to overthrow King You. In the Battle of Mount Li King You and Bofu were killed, and Bao Si captured. Ji Yijiu ascended the throne. At about the same time, Jī Hàn (姬翰), Duke of Guó (虢公), elevated Jī Yúchén (姬余臣) to the throne as King Xie of Zhou (周携王), and the Zhou Dynasty saw a period of two parallel kings until King Xie was killed by Marquis Wen of Jin (晋文侯) in 750 BCE.

King Ping moved the Western Zhou dynasty's capital east from Haojing to Luoyang, thus ending the Western Zhou and beginning the Eastern Zhou dynasty and the Spring and Autumn period. He is the first Zhou king to be mentioned in the chronological account of the Zuo Zhuan.

Over 14 centuries after King Ping’s death, Tang dynasty Empress regnant Wu Zetian claimed ancestry from King Ping through his son Prince Wu, and changed the dynastic name to Zhou, which was reverted to Tang after her death.

Family
Sons:
 First son, Crown Prince Xiefu, the father of King Huan of Zhou
 Second son, Prince Hu
 Served as a hostage of Duke Zhuang of Zheng
 Youngest son, Prince Wu

Ancestry

See also
 Family tree of ancient Chinese emperors

References 

720 BC deaths
Zhou dynasty kings
8th-century BC Chinese monarchs
Year of birth unknown
Founding monarchs